Jenny Eclair (born Jenny Clare Hargreaves; 16 March 1960) is an English comedian, novelist, and actress, best known for her roles in Grumpy Old Women between 2004 and 2007 and in Loose Women in 2011 and 2012.

Early life
Eclair was born to English parents in Kuala Lumpur, Malaya, where her father, Derek Hargreaves, a major in the British Army, had been posted in 1952. Eclair returned to England when she was two years old, and she started her education at Queen Mary school (now AKS Lytham, after two separate mergers) in Lytham St Annes.

She is said to have adopted the alternative surname Eclair (later her stage name) in her teens, when she was at a disco in Blackpool and pretended to be French. She studied at the Manchester Polytechnic School of Drama (now Manchester Metropolitan University) and joined a cabaret group variously referred to as Kathy Lacreme and the Rum Babas, and Cathy La Crème and the Rum Babas.

After she moved to London, Eclair's first job was at Camberwell Arts College as a life model, which she did for about two terms. She then saw an advert in The Stage looking for novelty acts and found work doing punk poems. In 1989, when she was named the Time Out Cabaret Award winner, she said it "was nice because it's the first time I've ever won without having to run 100 metres balancing an egg on a spoon."  In 1995, Eclair was the first woman to win the Perrier Award, now known as the Edinburgh Comedy Awards, at the Edinburgh Fringe Festival.

Television
After an early appearance as a German hotel worker in Auf Wiedersehen Pet Eclair starred in the ITV drama The Bill and appeared in the early 1990s Channel 4 comedy series Packet of Three with Frank Skinner, as well as the follow-up series Packing Them In. In 1995, she became the first female solo winner of the Edinburgh Fringe Festival's Perrier Comedy Award. In 1997, she played "Josie" in the stage play Steaming by Nell Dunn.  In 2001, she published her first novel Camberwell Beauty.

Eclair provided alternative commentary of the Eurovision Song Contest 2002 for BBC Choice viewers as part of the channel's Liquid Eurovision Party coverage, as a late replacement for broadcaster Christopher Price who died the month before the contest took place.

Grumpy Old Women

Eclair helped develop, and appeared on, BBC Two's Grumpy Old Women and its various spin-off shows. In 2006, Eclair starred in the stage show Grumpy Old Women Live! with Dillie Keane and Linda Robson. The show was co-written by Eclair and Judith Holder. The spring saw a sell-out national tour, and June and July a run at the Lyric Theatre in London's West End, and the autumn saw another national tour.

Loose Women

From 2011 to 2012, Eclair returned as a panellist on Loose Women, a show she was a panellist on in 2003. On 30 May 2012, she appeared on her last Loose Women show and was replaced by actress Shobna Gulati.

As a contestant
In 2005, Eclair appeared in the reality show Comic Relief Does Fame Academy.

On 18 November 2010, she joined the 2010 series of I'm a Celebrity... Get Me Out of Here!, finishing in third place behind Stacey Solomon and Shaun Ryder.

In August 2012, Eclair appeared in Celebrity MasterChef on BBC One.

In December 2022, it was announced that Eclair would appear in the fifteenth series of Taskmaster alongside comedians Frankie Boyle, Mae Martin, Kiell Smith-Bynoe and Ivo Graham, due to air in 2023.

Eclair was a contestant in The Great Pottery Throw Down's December 2022 festive celebrity show.

Splash!
On 25 January 2014, Eclair took part in the second series of the ITV celebrity diving show Splash!, appearing in the fourth heat.

Note* Scores are out of a possible 30 points in total.

Guest appearances
Room 101 (26 October 2005) – Guest
That Sunday Night Show (30 January 2011, 2 October 2011, 19 February 2012) – Panellist
The Chase: Celebrity Special (5 November 2011) – Contestant
Saturday Cookbook (7 July 2012) – Guest
Let's Do Lunch with Gino & Mel (19 July 2012) – Guest
Pointless Celebrities (12 December 2012) – Contestant
Tipping Point: Lucky Stars (30 June 2013) – Contestant
Weekend Kitchen with Waitrose (17 May 2014) – Guest
Draw It! (19–23 May 2014) – Contestant
Celebrity Fifteen to One (23 December 2014) – Contestant
Fifty Shades Uncovered (2015) – Contributor
QI – Series M, Episode 8 "Merriment" - (25 December 2015) - Panellist

Radio
Until April 2008, Eclair hosted a weekend talk show on LBC 97.3. Her other radio credits include appearing on BBC Radio 4 in the Just a Minute quiz and afternoon plays, various comedy shows on BBC 7 and regularly has covered for Sandi Toksvig on LBC's weekday lunchtime chat show (now defunct).

She has also hosted her own show on the London radio station LBC Radio and starred in various stage productions.

Eclair sat in for Danny Baker on BBC London 94.9 from Tuesday 30 August until Friday 2 September 2011.

Other work
Eclair fronts the Food Standards Agency's salt reduction campaign "Salt, is your food full of it?".

Eclair became an Ambassador for audiobook charity Listening Books in 2019

Eclair appeared at Derby Playhouse in The Killing of Sister George from 13 September 2008 until 18 October 2008.

Books
 The Book of Bad Behaviour (non-fiction) Virgin, 1994. ; 
 Camberwell Beauty (novel) Little, Brown, 2000. ; 
 Sit-Down Comedy (contributor to anthology, ed Malcolm Hardee & John Fleming) Ebury Press/Random House, 2003. ; 
 Having a Lovely Time (novel) Little, Brown, 2005. ; 
 Life, Death and Vanilla Slices (novel) Sphere, 2012. ; 
 Moving (novel) Sphere, 2015.  (Italian translation: Le stanze dei ricordi, Sperling & Kupfer, 2017. )

Personal life 
Eclair is married to Geoff Powell as of July 2017. She previously stated that marriages are naff. She is the mother of the playwright Phoebe Eclair-Powell (b. 1990).

References

External links
 
 

1960 births
20th-century English actresses
20th-century English women writers
21st-century English actresses
21st-century English women writers
Alumni of Manchester Metropolitan University
English television personalities
English women novelists
Living people
English women comedians
People educated at King Edward VII and Queen Mary School
20th-century English writers
21st-century English writers
People from Kuala Lumpur
People from Lytham St Annes
I'm a Celebrity...Get Me Out of Here! (British TV series) participants
20th-century English comedians
21st-century English comedians